Serge Wilfried Kanon (born 6 July 1993) is an Ivorian professional footballer who plays mainly as a centre-back for Finnish club HIFK and the Ivory Coast national team.

Club career

Early career
Born in Taabo, Ivory Coast, Kanon made his debut for Empoli's junior team in 2010 in the Primavera championship. At the age of 17, he scored for the youth side in a 2–2 draw with Novara.

Gloria Bistrița and Corona Brașov
After impressing during his trial period at Gloria Bistrița in Romania, club coach Nicolae Manea decided to offer Kanon a contract. He made his Liga I debut on 22 July, in a 2–1 defeat against Astra Ploiești in which he played 40 minutes of the game.

In the 2012–13 season, Kanon and several other players followed Manea at Corona Brașov. He featured as a left-back in the campaign opener, a 1–0 defeat to Oțelul Galați at home. Kanon established himself as a regular starter, but missed the sixth fixture due to work permit issues.

ADO Den Haag
Following the work permit issues at Corona Brașov, Kanon was released to sign a two-year contract with Eredivisie team ADO Den Haag. The issues also continued in the Netherlands and prevented him from playing during the first half of the season. On 25 January 2014, he made his debut for the club in the 3–2 home win over Feyenoord.

In July 2015, Kanon was close to signing for Ligue 1 club Lille, which offered a €500,000 fee for his transfer. There, he would had been reunited with manager Hervé Renard, who coached him during Ivory Coast's conquest of the Africa Cup of Nations in 2015. Medical examinations which revealed cardiac arrhythmia made the move fall through, and Kanon returned to The Hague to undergo heart surgery.

During the 2016–17 season, he totalled 28 appearances and scored once. His only goal came on the last matchday of the season in a 4–1 win over Excelsior.

Pyramids
Kanon joined Egyptian Premier League side Pyramids on 18 September 2019. On 1 February 2021, he agreed to a six-month loan with Qatar Stars League side Al-Gharafa.

HIFK
On 28 March 2022, Kanon signed with HIFK in Finland.

Career statistics

International

Scores and results list Ivory Coast's goal tally first, score column indicates score after each Kanon goal.

Honours
Ivory Coast
Africa Cup of Nations: 2015

References

External links
 
 
 
 Voetbal International profile 

1993 births
Living people
Ivorian expatriate footballers
Ivorian expatriate sportspeople in Egypt
Ivorian expatriate sportspeople in Finland
Ivorian expatriate sportspeople in France
Ivorian expatriate sportspeople in Italy
Ivorian expatriate sportspeople in Qatar
Ivorian expatriate sportspeople in Romania
Ivorian expatriate sportspeople in the Netherlands
Ivorian footballers
Ivory Coast international footballers
2015 Africa Cup of Nations players
2017 Africa Cup of Nations players
2019 Africa Cup of Nations players
2021 Africa Cup of Nations players
ACF Gloria Bistrița players
ADO Den Haag players
Africa Cup of Nations-winning players
Al-Gharafa SC players
Association football defenders
CSM Corona Brașov footballers
Empoli F.C. players
HIFK Fotboll players
Pyramids FC players
Liga I players
Eredivisie players
Egyptian Premier League players
Qatar Stars League players
Expatriate footballers in Egypt
Expatriate footballers in Finland
Expatriate footballers in France
Expatriate footballers in Italy
Expatriate footballers in Qatar
Expatriate footballers in Romania
Expatriate footballers in the Netherlands
People from Lagunes District